The second and final season of the American television series The Gifted is based on Marvel Comics' X-Men properties, and follows ordinary parents who take their family on the run after they discover their children's mutant abilities. The season is connected to the X-Men film series, set in an alternate timeline where the X-Men have disappeared. It was produced by 20th Century Fox Television in association with Marvel Television, with Matt Nix serving as showrunner.

Stephen Moyer and Amy Acker star as the parents, alongside Sean Teale, Natalie Alyn Lind, Percy Hynes White, Coby Bell, Jamie Chung, Blair Redford, and Emma Dumont. They are joined by Skyler Samuels, promoted from a recurring guest role in the first season, and Grace Byers. A second season was ordered in January 2018, and began filming that June. It depicts the different approaches to the fight for mutant civil rights that are taken by the Mutant Underground and the Hellfire Club, and also introduces the Morlocks and further explores the Purifiers—all groups originating in the comics.

The season aired between September 25, 2018 and February 26, 2019, and consisted of 16 episodes.

Episodes

Cast and characters

Main
 Stephen Moyer as Reed Strucker
 Amy Acker as Caitlin Strucker
 Sean Teale as Marcos Diaz / Eclipse
 Natalie Alyn Lind as Lauren Strucker
 Percy Hynes White as Andy Strucker
 Coby Bell as Jace Turner
 Jamie Chung as Clarice Fong / Blink
 Blair Redford as John Proudstar / Thunderbird
 Emma Dumont as Lorna Dane / Polaris
 Skyler Samuels as the Frost Sisters
 Grace Byers as Reeva Payge

Recurring
 Hayley Lovitt as Sage
 Michael Luwoye as Erg
 Anjelica Bette Fellini as Rebecca Hoover / Twist
 Jeff Daniel Phillips as Fade
 Tom O'Keefe as Officer Ted Wilson
 Peter Gallagher as Benedict Ryan
 James Carpinello as Max

Notable guests
 Ray Campbell as William
 Erinn Ruth as Evangeline
 Frances Turner as Paula Turner
 Sumalee Montano as Dr. Taylor
 Kathryn Erbe as Aunt Dane 
 Kate Burton as Dr. Madeline Risman
 Ken Kirby as Noah
 Jeffrey Nordling as Daniel

Production

Development
In October 2017, showrunner Matt Nix said that he had planned "a couple of seasons, in broad strokes" for The Gifted, and stated that he wanted "to be doing this show for a long time." On January 4, 2018, the series was renewed for a second season, of 16 episodes.

Writing
Following the end of the first season, Nix said that the second would further explore the Hellfire Club and the Purifiers, and would introduce the Morlocks. Following the destruction of the mutant underground's base, the second season sees them become more of a network rather than remain in a single location, and forces them to hide in plain sight and interact with other mutants out in the world. Nix thought this was both an interesting change and "thematically more resonant". Their situation is contrasted with the Hellfire Club also hiding in plain sight, but within "the halls of power". Nix continued that the season would show how these two factions go about helping mutants in different ways, and also how they come together at times due to the relationships between people in each group. He later expressed interest in also exploring the 7/15 incident that was mentioned in the first season, potentially through flashbacks, and said that such an exploration would take place over multiple episodes as "it’s kind of at the center of everything we’re doing."

The second season features a new organization from the comics after the first featured Trask Industries. Nix noted that the story for the season had been broken before this decision was made, and then the writers looked through the comics to see which elements lines up with the direction they wanted to go.

Casting
Returning from the first season to star are Stephen Moyer as Reed Strucker, Amy Acker as Caitlin Strucker, Sean Teale as Marcos Diaz / Eclipse, Natalie Alyn Lind as Lauren Strucker, Percy Hynes White as Andy Strucker, Coby Bell as Jace Turner, Jamie Chung as Clarice Fong / Blink, Blair Redford as John Proudstar / Thunderbird, and Emma Dumont as Lorna Dane / Polaris. By January 2018, Skyler Samuels, who recurred as the Stepford Cuckoos in the first season, was being looked at to be promoted to series regular for the show's second season, and she stated that her characters would be appearing more in the second season than the first either way. She was confirmed to be doing so in June along with the announcement that Grace Byers would also be joining the series as a series regular, in the role of Reeva Payge.

Also returning from the first season are Ray Campbell as William, Hayley Lovitt as Sage, Jeff Daniel Phillips as Fade, Erinn Ruth as Evangeline, and Francis Turner as Paula Turner. Additionally, Michael Luwoye was announced to have been cast as Erg, the leader of the Morlocks, in August 2018. Nix also revealed at that time that an original mutant named Twist would have a "big role" in the season. Newcomer Anjelica Bette Fellini was soon announced as cast in the role, which was described as coming across as "a sweet wounded bird" who reveals herself to be "a sociopath who lives for chaos". In October, James Carpinello was cast in the recurring role of Max, the undisciplined leader of a group of new recruits.

Filming
Filming for the season began on May 30, 2018.

Release

Broadcast
The season began airing in the United States on Fox on September 25, 2018, and ran for 16 episodes.

Marketing
Nix, executive producer Jeph Loeb, and much of the cast promoted the season at San Diego Comic-Con 2018, where the first trailer for the season debuted; it gave the season the subtitle Dawn of the Mutant Age.

Reception

Ratings

Critical response
The review aggregator website Rotten Tomatoes reported an 83% approval rating, with an average rating of 6.83/10 based on 12 reviews. The website's consensus states, "The Gifted continues to explore shades of grey, but with a more streamlined story that sets the show up for a stronger — if slightly more simplistic — sophomore season."

References

External links

2018 American television seasons
2019 American television seasons
02